Eldred Simkins (August 30, 1779 – November 17, 1831) was a U.S. Representative from South Carolina.

Born in Edgefield, South Carolina, Simkins attended Moses Waddel's academy at Willington, Abbeville District, South Carolina, and graduated from South Carolina College (now the University of South Carolina) at Columbia.
He attended Litchfield (Connecticut) Law School for three years.
He was admitted to the bar in 1805 and commenced practice in Edgefield, South Carolina, in 1806.
He served as member of the State house of representatives.
He served in the State senate 1810–1812 and then as the 25th Lieutenant Governor of the State 1812–1814.

Simkins was elected as a Democratic-Republican to the Fifteenth Congress to fill the vacancy caused by the resignation of John C. Calhoun.
He was reelected to the Sixteenth Congress and served from January 24, 1818, to March 3, 1821.
He served as chairman of the Committee on Public Expenditures (Sixteenth Congress).
He declined to be a candidate for renomination.
He was again a member of the State house of representatives from 1828 to 1829.
He resumed the practice of his profession and also engaged in planting.
He died in Edgefield, South Carolina, November 17, 1831.
He was interred in Cedar Fields, the family burial ground, near Edgefield, South Carolina.

Sources

1779 births
1831 deaths
University of South Carolina alumni
Democratic-Republican Party members of the United States House of Representatives from South Carolina